A kickline is a show dance figure consisting of a series of dancers who throw their legs synchronised up to eye level in the air, forming a straight line. The difficulty here is not only to lift the leg in a coordinated manner to create a uniform impression, but also to lower it again quickly enough to switch between the standing and throwing leg in quick succession. 

Well-known kicklines are formed by the New York Rockettes or the ensemble of Berlin's Friedrichstadt-Palast. Kicklines are also performed in cheerleading.

References

Dance moves